This list is of the Places of Scenic Beauty of Japan located within the Metropolis of Tōkyō.

National Places of Scenic Beauty
As of 1 January 2021, fourteen Places have been designated at a national level (including three *Special Places of Scenic Beauty).

Prefectural Places of Scenic Beauty
As of 1 May 2020, twelve Places have been designated at a prefectural level.

Municipal Places of Scenic Beauty
As of 1 May 2020, three Places have been designated at a municipal level.

Registered Historic Sites
As of 1 January 2021, three Monuments have been registered (as opposed to designated) as Places of Scenic Beauty at the national level.

See also
 Cultural Property (Japan)
 List of parks and gardens of Tokyo
 List of Historic Sites of Japan (Tokyo)
 Ueno Park

References

External links
  Cultural Properties of Tokyo

Tourist attractions in Tokyo
Tokyo
Lists of tourist attractions in Japan
Tokyo-related lists

ja:Category:東京都にある国指定の名勝